James Philip Shellenback (born November 18, 1943) is an American former professional baseball pitcher and coach. He appeared in 165 Major League games for the Pittsburgh Pirates (1966–1967; 1969), Washington Senators/Texas Rangers (1969–1974) and Minnesota Twins (1977). The ,  Shellenback threw and batted left-handed. He is the nephew of the late Frank Shellenback, also a former MLB pitcher and coach.

In his nine-year MLB career, he had a 16–30 record, 48 games started, eight complete games, two shutouts, 36 games finished, two saves, 454 innings pitched, 443 hits allowed, 228 runs allowed, 192 earned runs allowed, 40 home runs allowed, 200 bases on balls, 222 strikeouts, eight hit batsmen, six wild pitches, 1,960 batters faced, 14 intentional base on balls, two balks and a 3.81 earned run average.

Like his uncle, who won a record 295 games in the Pacific Coast League, Jim Shellenback had success in minor league baseball. In his second pro year, with the 1963 Gastonia Pirates, he won 17 of 20 decisions and posted a 2.03 earned run average. He won 103 minor league games over 12 seasons.

Shellenback was a longtime coach in the Twins' minor league system, and served on their Major League staff in 1983. He also managed the Triple-A Portland Beavers from June 22, 1988, through the end of the season after the resignation of Jim Mahoney. Late in his career, Shellenback was the pitching coach of the Rookie-level Elizabethton Twins of the Appalachian League for 18 consecutive seasons, from 1994 through his 2011 retirement.

References

External links
, or Retrosheet, or Pelota Binaria (Venezuelan Winter League)

1943 births
Living people
Asheville Tourists players
Baseball coaches from California
Baseball players from Riverside, California
Cardenales de Lara players
American expatriate baseball players in Venezuela
Columbus Jets players
Florida Instructional League Pirates players
Gastonia Pirates players
Harlan Smokies players
Hawaii Islanders players
Idaho Falls Yankees players
Major League Baseball pitchers
Minnesota Twins coaches
Minnesota Twins players
Minor league baseball coaches
Orlando Twins players
Pittsburgh Pirates players
Portland Beavers managers
Spokane Indians players
Sportspeople from Riverside, California
Texas Rangers players
Washington Senators (1961–1971) players